Bassinthegrass (styled as BASSINTHEGRASS) is an Australian music festival. It is the largest music festival in the Northern Territory, and has been held annually since 2003 in the territory capital. The festival is operated by the Northern Territory Government through the Northern Territory Major Events Company, part of a project of the previous Martin government to bring prominent bands to the territory and showcase local talent. BASSINTHEGRASS has grown rapidly since its inception, resulting in the imposition of cap on ticket numbers in 2007. A sister festival, Bassinthedust, had been held in Alice Springs commencing in 2004, but was shelved in 2008.

History

Established in 2003, BASSINTHEGRASS is the Northern Territory's biggest and longest-running music festival.

The festival was first held in 2003 to fulfill a campaign promise by the government to hold a Big Day Out-style youth concert in the territory. It was held in both Darwin and Alice Springs in its inaugural year, with the Alice Springs leg later becoming the Bassinthedust festival. 5000 people attended the Darwin leg, with a further 1500 in Alice Springs, listening to headline acts The Living End, 30 Odd Foot of Grunts, and NoKTuRNL. It became an annual event.

It became a Darwin-only festival in 2004 with the creation of Bassinthedust, and a crowd of 6000 turned out to a hear a larger lineup. Radio personality Jackie O had been meant to MC the event, but arrived nine hours late, and stormed off stage after being booed by the crowd and played over by Frenzal Rhomb in an incident that received national media coverage. You Am I, Little Birdy, Evermore, Regurgitator and Anthony Callea headlined the festival in 2005.

The festival switched to a two-stage format in 2006. 
BASS is a Darwin rite of passage, and in its 18 years has seen some of the country's biggest acts perform to sold-out crowds. In 2019, the festival moved to a bigger, new seaside location at Mindil Beach (famous for its sunsets) and hasn't looked back since. The 2019 event sold out at 10,000 tickets.

Artist lineup by year

2003

 The Living End
 One Dollar Short
 Machine Gun Fellatio
 30 Odd Foot of Grunts
 Sophie Monk
 28 Days
 Selwyn
 Endorphin
 NoKTuRNL
 Three on a Tree
 Plan B
 Leon Spurling
 Culture Connect
 Cinco Loco
 Llypente Apurte
 Shellie Morris
 Public Holdup

2004

 Grinspoon
 Frenzal Rhomb
 The Dissociatives
 The Superjesus
 Jebediah
 Human Nature
 Shannon Noll
 Roymackonkey
 Even
 Hairy Lemon
 Sophie Koh
 World Fly
 Lifted Mace
 Elysium
 Plonker

2005

 You Am I
 Regurgitator
 Anthony Callea
 Little Birdy
 The Flairz
 Thirsty Merc
 Nabarlek
 Evermore
 Vanessa Amorosi
 The Spazzys
 Black Chapel
 Test Theory
 Pop Fantastic
 Storm Riders
 Vassy

2006

 Stokes Hill
 Neo
 Zenith ASP
 Flesh Petal
 28 Days
 Gerling
 Faker
 Lee Harding
 Worldfly
 The Herd
 Something for Kate
 Pete Murray
 Hilltop Hoods
 The Living End

2007

Jet
Eskimo Joe
Hilltop Hoods
Shannon Noll
Young Divas
Little Birdy
Behind Crimson Eyes
TZU
Mammal
Lowrider
The Strikes
The Weathermen
The Moxie
Enth Degree

2008

Powderfinger
Hilltop Hoods
The Potbelleez
Wolfmother
Gyroscope
Mammal
The Audreys
Hercules of NY
Front House
Roymackonkey
The Moving Targets
Terracotta Pigeons

2009

The Living End
The Cat Empire
Sneaky Sound System
Gabriella Climi
Augie March
Bliss n Eso
Seany B / Matt Roberts
Unbroken Expanse
The Aviators
Push Crew
Enth Degree

2010

Silverchair
Hilltop Hoods
Empire of the Sun
Jessica Mauboy
Children Collide
Short Stack
Horrorshow
Redcoats
Sleeveheads (Battle of the School Bands Winner)
DJ Fish
Sweet Amber
Semishigure
Leigh Chisholm

2011

The Presets
Sneaky Sound System
Birds of Tokyo
Art Vs Science
British India
The Potbelleez
Dead Letter Circus
Hayley Warner
Justice Crew
DT3
Unbroken Expanse
Ned & Friends

2012

The Temper Trap
Hilltop Hoods
Boy & Bear
The Jezabels
Reece Mastin
Drapht
360
Stonefield
Calling All Cars
Redcoats
Emma Rowe and the Two Other Guys
Skarlett
N.E.A.L Boys
Elcah Rane

2013

360
Matt Corby
Flume
Grinspoon
The Amity Affliction
Illy
Hermitude
Amy Meredith
Kingswood
Chasin Aces
My Team Dilemma
Rambutan Jam Band
Joshua Goodrem

2014

The Amity Affliction
Pendulum DJ Set
The Living End
Rufus
Vance Joy
Peking Duk
Justice Crew
OK Kaleidoscope
Michael Lindsey
Allday
Jackie Onasis
Owl Eyes
Bear Essence
Skank MC

2015

Hilltop Hoods
Birds of Tokyo
Flight Facilities
Sheppard
Illy
The Preatures
Kingswood
Thundamentals
Roymackonkey
Tha Trigger
Kid Mac
Jarred & Prayer
Champagne with Mary Jane

2016

Angus & Julia Stone
Bliss N Eso
Boy & Bear
Drapht
Hermitude
Rüfüs
Safia
Tkay Maidza
Violent Soho
Gaia
Tapestry
At The Dakota

2017

Amy Shark
BOO SEEKA
John Butler Trio
L D R U
Peking Duk
The Rubens
Tash Sultana
Thundamentals
The Veronicas

2018

Client Liaison
Confidence Man
Dean Lewis
Dune Rats
Illy
Paul Kelly
San Cisco
Spit Syndicate
Vera Blue

2019

Allday
Amy Shark
Ball Park Music
Broods
Caiti Baker
DZ Deathrays
Hermitude
Hilltop Hoods
Hot Dub Time Machine
Karnivool
The Lunar Society
Mallrat
Meg Mac
Chet Faker
PNAU
Ruel
SIX60
Tasman Keith
Tapestry
Kyle Maher
Open Scars

2020
Festival postponed to 2021 due to COVID-19

2021

Boo Seeka
Chillinit
DMA's
G Flip
Hayden James
Illy
Jack River
Lime Cordiale
Missy Higgins
Ocean Alley
Peking Duk
SAFIA
The Jungle Giants
The Rubens
Thelma Plum
Violent Soho
Draftday
Scrubfowl
Big T and S Evans
Marlon featuring Rulla
Casii Williams

2022

Boy & Bear
Dope Lemon
Dune Rats
G Flip
Hilltop Hoods
Hockey Dad
Hooligan Hefs
Hot Dub Time Machine
Jessica Mauboy
Mako Road
MSON
Montaigne
Peking Duk
Phoebe Olivia
The Dreggs
The Teskey Brothers
Vera Blue
Xavier Rudd

2023

Amy Shark
Angus & Julia Stone
Babe Rainbow
Baker Boy
Guy Sebastian
Hooligan Hefs
Jack Botts Music
LDRU
MAY-A
Ocean Alley
Peach PRC
The Presets
San Cisco
Spacey Jane
Steph Strings
Tones & I

References

External links
 Official BASSINTHEGRASS site

Festivals in the Northern Territory
Music festivals established in 2003
Recurring events established in 2003
Music festivals in Australia
Tourist attractions in Darwin, Northern Territory
Electronic music festivals in Australia
Rock festivals in Australia